Declan Jones (born 11 May 1995) is a British racing driver. In 2018 Declan competes in Historic Racing , driving for Kelvin Jones Motorsport in the "Tatty Turner"

Career 

Declan began his career in karting in 2005.

In 2013, at 17 years of age, Declan became one of the youngest ever winners in the British GT race series. Declan finished 2nd in the 2013 GT4 category.

Racing career 

Declan began Karting in 2005. Moving into cadet karts. Winning 4 out of 5 novice cups available. In 2007 Declan became mini max Hooton Park Champion, and took multiple wins at local club rounds.

2008 Declan moved into Junior Max, becoming MBKC winter series champion at 3 sisters, Dragon Master winner at Gyg in Wales and gained 3rd in the Rotax Cup at 3 Sisters. Declan finished 2nd over all in the MBKC Championship.

2009 Declan joined Junior Max. finishing 14th in Formula Kart Stars. The same season Declan finished 2nd in Dragon Master Cup. Declan also gained multiple club wins around the country.

In 2010 Declan continued in Junior Max and became MBKC winter series winner at 3 Sisters and 2nd overall in the championship as well as Dragon Master Cup winner at Gyg. Declan also gained multiple wins around the uk. He gained 15th in Super One Championship and joint 3rd in Formula Kart Start Championship. Also that season Declan became Cumbria O Plate winner and won the last round of Formula Kart Stars at Ellough Park. The 2010 season also gave Declan a taste of the future in the form of the Ginetta junior scholarship. Getting through to the last 12.

2011 saw the eventual move from Karting. Joining the Ginetta Juniors and gaining multiple top 10 finishes. Ending a successful year in a very respectable 13th position in the championship.

In 2012 the ever confident Declan began racing in the VdeV Endurance Championship. The Dijon 2hr race saw a victory in his class, 3rd in prototypes and 6th overall.

2012 also witnessed Declan enter the Ginetta GT Supercup, The support race to the British Touring Car Championship. First time out at Oulton Park Declan put his car on pole by just over 7 tenths of a second and finished 3rd on the Sunday race. At Knockhill Declan finished 2nd and 3rd. At Rockingham Declan finished a 3rd and at Silverstone gained a 2nd and 1st. The last round at Brands Hatch saw Declan gain a 1st and 2nd and 3rd.

In 2013 and 2014 Declan raced in the British GT Championship.

In 2017 Declan raced in the Ginetta GT4 Supercup.

In 2018 Jones drove a Ginetta G55 GT4 with fellow-Ginetta driver Lucky Khera.

2018 Ginetta GT5 Challenge 
Declan joined W2R Motorsport, with support from Whitley Neill Gin to race in the Ginetta GT5 Challenge races at Knockhill on 26/27 August. 
Declan qualified his Ginetta G40 a great third overall on the Saturday morning. Despite being forced onto the grass in the race Declan finished in 3rd position.

In the Sunday race Declan produced a fast start in the torrential rain to grab third straight away, however the red flags were out almost immediately due to a multi-car incident behind. It was déjà vu at the restart though, with another quick launch getting him back into the top three.
A brilliant move out of the final hairpin on lap two moved him into second, which he maintained through a safety car period. As the action resumed, Jones pushed hard for the lead but a backmarker blocking him heading into the high-speed chicane led to unfortunate contact.

With his Ginetta G40 receiving damage, Jones was unable to mount a full recovery drive in the limited laps remaining and took the chequered flag in sixth position, a result that capped off a hugely impressive debut in the championship.

2018 Historic Racing 
For 2018 Declan is driving the 1960 "Tatty Turner" in Historic Racing.

Race 1: Oulton Park
Declan started the first race of the season at Oulton Park on pole position driving the "Tatty Turner" in the AMOC 50s Sports Car race. AMOC Racing Despite a slow start off the line Declan was back in front within a few laps and maintained first position through to the end of the race.  Race Result and Analysis

Ginetta GT4 Supercup 2017 
For 2017 Declan signed up again with Century Motorsport to drive a Ginetta G55 GT4 in the Ginetta flagship championship with sponsorship from Whitley Neill Gin. So far in 2017 Declan has scored two 3rd place finishes at Donington Park.

Round 1: Brands Hatch
Declan Jones came close to putting his Whitley Neill Gin branded- Ginetta G55 on the podium in the opening round of the 2017 Michelin Ginetta GT4 Supercup. Declan then managed to finish eighth in the opening race, despite dropping to tenth at the start when he couldn’t engage second gear. He had then just got up to fourth in the second race, when two laps from the end a battle with a rival competitor ended with the 21-year-old punted into the pit wall. The race was red-flagged as a result. 
On Sunday, after fantastic overnight effort by Century Motorsport to re-build his car for the third and final race of the weekend that was broadcast live on UK television on ITV4, Declan battled his way through from the back to finish fourth only 0.835secs off the final spot on the rostrum.

Round 2: Donington Park
Declan battled his way through the field to fourth in the opening race on Saturday, despite starting in ninth after on-going niggles with the car.

Declan then went one better in the second race on Sunday, to equal his best-ever result in the Ginetta GT4 SuperCup, before another fine drive in the damp third and final race saw him again finish third – netting him his strongest overall weekend showing yet in the G55s. The results vault the Century Motorsport-Whitley Neill Gin team man up from ninth to joint second in the 2017 Michelin Ginetta GT4 SuperCup Drivers’ Championship with 110 points on the board.

Round 3: Oulton Park
Following Friday practice, Declan was fifth fastest in qualifying on the Saturday, less than a tenth off a place on the second row, despite very tricky wet slippery conditions. Declan then made a good start to the first race, before a little mistake on the second lap at Knickerbrook corner cruelly put him out. With his car fixed for the second race on Sunday, however, Declan kept his composure, hauling himself up from tenth to seventh and featuring heavily in the coverage broadcast live on UK television on ITV4. Seventh also netted him 16 valuable points for the Century Motorsport-Whitley Neill Gin team, leaving him sixth in the Championship.

Round 4: Croft

Round 5: Snetterton
Declan Jones claimed his first outright Ginetta win in his Whitley Neill Gin branded-Ginetta G55 during round five of the 2017 Michelin Ginetta GT4 SuperCup.
 
Declan Jones switched to running with Rob Boston Racing for the second half of the season, began the event well and was fourth quickest overall in practice on Friday.
 
Declan then maintained that form in qualifying to secure a position on the second row of the grid, just 0.155 secs off third.
 
In the opening race, he fought back after a tricky start to bag fifth, before a brilliant performance in Sunday’s opener, race 2, saw him jump to third at the start and then proceed to claim victory.

That result – combined with a seventh place in race 3 that was broadcast live on UK television on ITV4 – saw him pick up 71 points in total from the weekend, moving the Rob Boston Racing-Whitely Neill Gin team man back up to fifth in the Championship with 243 points in total.

Round 6: Rockingham
Declan Jones took his second win from as many events in his Whitley Neill Gin branded-Ginetta G55 during round six (August 26–27). The Halewood Wines & Spirits-backed star was in superb form in the third and final race of the weekend that was broadcast live on UK television on ITV4, leading from lights-to-flag and eventually easing away to finish over 3.5 seconds up on his nearest rival.

The Rob Boston Racing-Whitley Neill Gin team man claimed his first ever Ginetta G55 pole in qualifying on the Saturday with a 1min 21.915sec lap to maintain the momentum that had seen him claim his maiden Ginetta G55 win last time out at Snetterton. At the start of race one, however, he found himself unable to see the lights properly, and he retired on the first lap.

Declan stormed through from tenth on the grid to fourth in the second race, before winning the third and final race of the weekend. It was his fourth podium of the season, increasing his year-to-date tally to 301 points - just over a win off third place in the standings.

Round 7: Silverstone
The Halewood Wines & Spirits-backed star again displayed race-winning pace and in the third and final race of the weekend battled his way through from ninth to third, grabbing the final rostrum position right at the end. However, due to a timing issue, all competitors did one extra lap, and on count back Declan was classified fourth.
Despite that though, Declan showed good pace throughout and was fifth fastest in qualifying on the Saturday, just 0.033secs off the second row and only 0.309secs off pole. 
The Rob Boston Racing-Whitley Neill Gin team man then took fourth in the opening race, before being punted off with only a handful of laps remaining while running in the same position in the rain delayed second race.
The final race might not have seen him take his third podium from as many events but the 22-year-old could still console himself with the fact he posted the fastest lap of the race and left having increased his season tally to 358 points in total, leaving him well in contention in the battle for third and fourth in the Championship – 19 points off P4.

Round 8: Brands Hatch
Declan Jones finished the season by claiming two more podiums in his Whitley Neill Gin branded-Ginetta G55 during the eighth and final round of the 2017 Michelin Ginetta GT4 SuperCup at Brands Hatch.
The Halewood Wines & Spirits-backed star ran at the front throughout the weekend and in qualifying on the Saturday posted the third fastest time, just 0.133secs off pole position and only 0.054secs off a place on the front row.
Declan then made a good start in the opening race, moving to second and shadowing the leader all the way to the chequered flag.
Race two on Sunday morning yielded another runners-up spot for the Rob Boston Racing-Whitley Neill Gin team man, who was battling for a rostrum from start-to-finish, snatching P2 on the final lap with a superb move up the inside of two of his rivals, despite very tricky wet conditions.
In the third and final race of the weekend Declan made a good start and even though something broke on the rear of his car, he still brought it home in P4. That result helped ensure he secured fourth position in the Championship, ending the season with 440 points on the board.
  
Meanwhile, Rob Boston Racing boss, Rob Boston was delighted with Declan’s form, especially as it helped the Lincolnshire squad secure the Team's Championship.

Championship Points 

B: Brands Hatch Indy, D: Donington, OP: Oulton Park, C: Croft, Sn: Snetterton, R: Rockingham, S: Silverstone,

British GT Championship 

For 2013, Declan Jones signed for Century Motorsport to compete in the British GT Championship, partnering Zoë Wenham, for the first 5 rounds, and Nathan Freke for rounds 6 and 7,in a GT4-class Ginetta G50. He finished 1st in the first two rounds at Oulton Park becoming one of the youngest ever winners in the series.

For 2014 Declan Jones again will compete in the Avon Tyres British GT Championship, running with ABG Motorsport and using a BMW GT4.

Declan Jones began the 2014 Avon Tyres British GT Championship with two fifth places at Oulton Park.

Championship Points History

Victories

Former Team-mates

Racing record

Complete Britcar results
(key) (Races in bold indicate pole position in class – 1 point awarded just in first race; races in italics indicate fastest lap in class – 1 point awarded all races;-

† Not ineligible for points as he was an invitation entry.

References

External links 
 

Living people
English racing drivers
1995 births
British GT Championship drivers
Sportspeople from Liverpool
Britcar drivers
Ginetta GT4 Supercup drivers
Ginetta Junior Championship drivers